Krachtsportgebouw ("strength sport building") was a multi-purpose sports arena located in Amsterdam, Netherlands. Known during the 1928 Summer Olympics as the Wrestling Pavilion, it hosted the wrestling, boxing, and weightlifting events.

Krachtsportgebouw was designed by architect Jan Wils. It could accommodate 2,840 people seated and 1,794 standing and included a shower, 15 dressing rooms, and an administrative office.

References
1928 Summer Olympic official report. pp. 200–1, 205.

Venues of the 1928 Summer Olympics
Olympic boxing venues
Olympic weightlifting venues
Olympic wrestling venues
Sports venues in Amsterdam